Pempelia alpigenella is a species of snout moth. It is found in France, Italy, Albania, North Macedonia, Bulgaria, Greece, Ukraine and Russia.

References

Moths described in 1836
Phycitini
Moths of Europe